In Christian iconography plants appear mainly as attributes on the pictures of Christ or the Virgin Mary. Christological plants are among others the vine, the columbine, the carnation and the flowering cross, which grows out of an acanthus plant surrounded by tendrils. Mariological symbols include the rose, lily, olive, cedar, cypress and palm. Plants also appear as attributes of saints, especially virgins and martyrs.

Background
In Christian art plants and flowers show up chiefly as traits on the photos of Christ or the Virgin Mary. Plants additionally show up as characteristics of holy people, particularly virgins and saints.

Plants in Christian iconography

See also
 Christian symbolism
 Arma Christi
 Animals in Christian art
 Saint symbolism

Notes

References

Christian iconography
Plants in art
Plants in religion